Tin Can Island Port (TCIP) is located in Apapa, the port for the city of Lagos. Tin Can Island Port is seven kilometers due west of the center of Lagos across Lagos Harbor.

Tin Can Island Port was begun in 1976 and opened in 1977. In 1991, the Nigerian Ports Authority became responsible for operating the port. The Roro Terminal was designated as part of the new Tin Can Island Port in 1977. Tin Can Island merged with Roro port in 2006 when private terminal operators, Port and Terminal Multiservices Ltd. (PTML) took over the terminals.
Since then, PTML has made efforts to redevelop the terminals.

Tin Can Island Port is the second busiest Port in Nigeria after Apapa Port.

The storage capacity of the silos is 28,000 metric tonnes of grain which is transported by Fleetwood Transportation. The terminal handles wheat, maize and malt and can take delivery of about 4000 metric tonnes of grain daily. The port facilities can handle ships of about 30,000 tonnes. There is also a grain bagging facility on-site.

References

External links

Ports and harbours of Lagos
1997 establishments in Nigeria